Garronite-Ca is a fairly rare silicate mineral, from the zeolite, which has been found in a few dozen locations in the world. It was first found in the Glenariff Valley, Garron Plateau, County Antrim, Northern Ireland, and in some locations in Iceland. The name comes from the town of Garron, in Northern Ireland, which is consequently considered its type locality. The name initially used was that of Garronite, without subfixes, but the discovery in 2015 of a garronite with dominant sodium instead of calcium in the position of interchangeable cations made it necessary to use subfixes, remaining as Garronite-Ca, to distinguish it from the new species, Garronite-Na.

Physical and chemical properties 
Garronite-Ca is generally found as masses and nodules with a finely fibrous internal structure, white in color, usually showing a concentric growth structure. This  causes the nodules to present with a conchoidal fracture. It is very  rare  as defined crystals. When crystals appear, they usually show the faces corresponding to {101} and {011}.

Localities 
Garronite-Ca is formed under hydrothermal conditions at low temperature. It is a rare zeolite, and very rare in the form of defined crystals. As fibrous masses, filling vacuoles in basalts, it has been found in the county of Antrim, in Northern Ireland (United Kingdom), and in the area of Fáskrúðsfjörður (Iceland). It is usually associated with phillipsite, which is located in the outer area of the nodules. As crystals, associated with calcite and analcime, it has been found in San Giorgio di Perlena, Fara Vicentino, Vicenza (Italy) and in Barranc Salat, Calpe, Alicante (Spain).

References 

Silicates
Silicate minerals
Zeolites
Calcium minerals